Azorella is a genus of flowering plants in the family Apiaceae, native to South America, New Zealand, southeastern Australia, and the islands of the Southern Ocean.

They are low-growing dwarf mat-forming plants growing in high exposure on mountains and subantarctic coasts; with great age they may form rounded mounds of foliage up to 1 m high but are usually less than 10 cm high. Several species are grown as ornamental plants in rock gardens.

Species
, Plants of the World Online accepted 58 species:

Azorella acaulis (Cav.) Drude
Azorella albovaginata (Gillies & Hook.) G.M.Plunkett & A.N.Nicolas
Azorella allanii (Cheeseman) G.M.Plunkett & A.N.Nicolas
Azorella ameghinoi Speg.
Azorella andina (Phil.) Drude
Azorella aretioides (Kunth) Willd. ex DC.
Azorella biloba (Schltdl.) Wedd.
Azorella boelckei (Mathias & Constance) G.M.Plunkett & A.N.Nicolas
Azorella burkartii (Mathias & Constance) G.M.Plunkett & A.N.Nicolas
Azorella cockaynei Diels
Azorella colensoi (Domin) G.M.Plunkett & A.N.Nicolas
Azorella compacta Phil.
Azorella corymbosa (Ruiz & Pav.) Pers.
Azorella crassipes Phil.
Azorella crenata (Ruiz & Pav.) Pers.
Azorella cryptantha (Clos) Reiche
Azorella cuatrecasasii Mathias & Constance
Azorella diapensioides A.Gray
Azorella diversifolia Clos
Azorella echegarayi (Hieron.) G.M.Plunkett & A.N.Nicolas
Azorella exigua (Hook.f.) Drude
Azorella filamentosa Lam.
Azorella fragosea (F.Muell.) Druce
Azorella fuegiana Speg.
Azorella haastii (Hook.f.) Drude
Azorella hallei (Skottsb.) G.M.Plunkett & A.N.Nicolas
Azorella hookeri Drude
Azorella hydrocotyloides (Hook.f.) Kirk
Azorella julianii Mathias & Constance
Azorella lyallii (J.B.Armstr.) G.M.Plunkett & A.N.Nicolas
Azorella lycopodioides Gaudich.
Azorella macquariensis Orchard
Azorella madreporica Clos
Azorella microphylla (Cav.) G.M.Plunkett & A.N.Nicolas
Azorella monantha Clos
Azorella monteroi S.Martínez & Constance
Azorella multifida (Ruiz & Pav.) Pers.
Azorella nitens Petrie
Azorella nivalis Phil.
Azorella pallida (Kirk) Kirk
Azorella patagonica Speg.
Azorella pedunculata (Spreng.) Mathias & Constance
Azorella polaris (Hombr. & Jacquinot) G.M.Plunkett & A.N.Nicolas
Azorella prolifera (Cav.) G.M.Plunkett & A.N.Nicolas
Azorella pulvinata Wedd.
Azorella ranunculus d'Urv.
Azorella robusta (Kirk) G.M.Plunkett & A.N.Nicolas
Azorella roughii (Hook.f.) Kirk
Azorella ruizii G.M.Plunkett & A.N.Nicolas
Azorella schizeilema G.M.Plunkett & A.N.Nicolas
Azorella selago Hook.f.
Azorella spinosa (Ruiz & Pav.) Pers.
Azorella triacantha (Griseb.) Mart.Fernández & C.I.Calviño
Azorella trifoliolata Clos
Azorella trifurcata (Gaertn.) Pers.
Azorella trisecta (H.Wolff) Mart.Fernández & C.I.Calviño
Azorella ulicina (Gillies & Hook.) G.M.Plunkett & A.N.Nicolas
Azorella valentini (Speg.) Mart.Fernández & C.I.Calviño

References 

 
Apiaceae genera
Taxa named by Jean-Baptiste Lamarck